Tim Berresheim (born 1975, Heinsberg, Germany) is a contemporary German visual artist who lives and works in Cologne. 
He studied at the Hochschule der Bildenden Künste in Braunschweig from 1998 to 2000 and the Kunstakademie in Düsseldorf from 2000-2000.  
He studied under the director, actor, and screenwriter Burkhard Driest and the German artist Albert Oehlen. 

Besides making visual art, Berresheim also makes music with fellow established contemporary German artist, Jonathan Meese.

References

External links
Artist's website
Tim Berresheim at Marc Jancou 
Tim Berresheim, “Studies in Future Blues”, 2010
"Tim Berresheim", Artnet

1975 births
Living people
German contemporary artists